松山 are Chinese characters that can be transliterated as either Songshan in Mandarin Chinese, Matsuyama in Japanese or Songsan in Korean and may refer to:

Places

Mainland China
Songshan District, Chifeng, Inner Mongolia
Towns
Songshan, Fujian, in Luoyuan County
Songshan, Guizhou, in Ziyun Miao and Buyei Autonomous County
Songshan, Gansu, in Bairi (Tianzhu) Tibetan Autonomous County
Songshan, Guangxi, in Rong County
Songshan, Liaoning, in Taihe District, Jinzhou
Songshan, Jilin, in Panshi

Japan
Matsuyama, Ehime, the capital city of Ehime Prefecture
Matsuyama, Kagoshima, a former town in Soo District in Kagoshima Prefecture
Matsuyama, Miyagi, a town in Shida District in Miyagi Prefecture
Matsuyama, Yamagata, a town in Akumi District in Yamagata Prefecture

South Korea
Songsan Station

Macau
Guia Hill, a hill in St. Lazarus Parish, Macau Peninsula

Taiwan
Songshan District, Taipei, Taiwan
Taipei Songshan Airport
Songshan Line (TRTS) of the Taipei Metro
Songshan Station

Other uses
Matsuyama (surname)

See also
 Matsuyama (disambiguation)
 Songsan
 Songshan (disambiguation)